The Roman Catholic Metropolitan Archdiocese of Palermo was founded as the Diocese of Palermo in the first century and raised to the status of archdiocese in the 11th century. The archbishop is Corrado Lorefice.

The archdiocese has the following suffragans in the ecclesiastical Province of Palermo:
Diocese of Cefalù
Diocese of Mazara del Vallo
Archdiocese of Monreale
Diocese of Trapani

History

Palermo is just south of a major active seismic zone, and is subject to frequent earthquakes and occasional inundations (tsunamis).  The events of 1693, 1726 and 1823 were particularly destructive.

Pope Gregory I personally founded six monasteries in Sicily, including the monastery of S. Hermes at Palermo, according to Ugo Benigni in his article on Sicily in the Catholic Encyclopedia. He also founded the monastery of S. Hadrian and the Praetoritanum.  Ugo Benigni attributes this interest to the numbers of bishops and monks who emigrated from Africa as a result of the policy of the Arian Vandals to the Orthodox Christians.

In 718 the Emperor Leo III the Isaurian (718–741) suppressed a revolt in Sicily, and then detached southern Italy and Sicily from the metropolitan jurisdiction of the pope in Rome.  In the ninth century, the patriarch of Constantinople raised the See of Palermo to the rank of metropolitan of all of Sicily.  A protest against these actions was entered by Pope Nicholas I (858–867), in a letter of 25 September 860 to the Emperor Michael III.

Arab control over Palermo and its church
Benigni states, "Concerning the state of the Sicilian Church during the Saracen domination we have no information: not the name of a single bishop is known."  This is misleading.  There were bishops, but they were part of the Patriarchate of Constantinople, not that of Rome, and Constantinople was in communion with Rome until the Great Schism of 1054.  In 883, Pope Marinus I paid a ransom to the emir of Palermo for the archbishop of Syracuse and the bishop of Malta, who were being held in prison in Palermo. In 897, the archbishop of Palermo was Sofronios (or Sonfronius). In 930, there was a seminary in operation under the direction of the archbishop of Palermo; when Eustatius was about to pay the 12,000 'krus' per annum which was owed, the collector, who noticed the extreme poverty of the students, gave part of the funds to the archbishop for the benefit of the seminary.    In 957 an archbishop named Arimattea was already occupying the see; in 964, Archbishop Arimattea was abused and imprisoned by the Grand Mufti of Palermo, from which he died.  In 965, the Archbishop of Palermo was Andreas, who had been vicar of Archbishop Arimattea. In 976, according to Arabic sources, the archbishop of Palermo died, and the priests and monks elected a new archbishop named Ananiah, who had been vicar of his predecessor. Patriarch Antony III of Constantinople was requested by an embassy from Palermo to approve the election, which he did, expressing the wish that the archbishop-elect should come to Constantinople and be consecrated by him. The emperor did not approve of these patriarchal pretensions, and the patriarch renounced them. The priests and monks told the emir of Sicily that the custom had been for the bishops of Sicily to consecrate the archbishop. They asked permission to write to the pope, which was refused.

Arab invasions of Sicily had begun at the beginning of the eighth century with the capture of the island of Cossura (modern Pantelleria).  Raids were launched in 730–731, 734–735, 740 and 752–753. Palermo was temporarily captured in 820, but the Arabs were driven out by pirates.  The serious conquest of the island began in 827, from the Tunisian port of Susa, led by Asad Ibn Al-Furàt.  Palermo fell in 831, Messina in 843, Leontini in 847, and Syracuse in 878. Taormina was captured in 902, completing the conquest of the entire island. From then until 1061, when the Norman conquests began, Sicily was an Arab land.

After the famine of 940, the Arabs deliberately drove Christians out of the western part of the island.

Norman control over the church of Palermo
On Christmas Day, 1130, Count Roger II was crowned King of Sicily in the Cathedral in Palermo.  It is uncertain who crowned the king.  One source names Count Roger of Capua, another Archbishop Peter of Palermo.  The cathedral was rebuilt by Archbishop Walter between 1170 and 1190.

The Archdiocese of Palermo was united with the Archdiocese of Monreale on 7 July 1775.  The union was dissolved on 12 March 1802.  Monreale lost its metropolitan status in 2000, however, and it is now a suffragan of the Archdiocese of Palermo.

The Cathedral of Palermo is dedicated to the Bodily Assumption of the Virgin Mary into Heaven.  The Chapter of the cathedral had three dignities in 1677, and two dignities in 1775.  In 1211 there were eighteen canons, but the number grew to twenty-four in 1431, when Pope Eugenius IV ordered their reduction to eighteen again.  In 1523 the Emperor Charles V added six more canons, bringing the number back up to twenty-four. There were again twenty-four canons in 1677 and twenty-six canons in 1775.  The chapter had the right to elect the archbishop.

List of Archbishops of Palermo

to 1200

...
Anonymous
Anonymous (447)
Gratianus (450–503)
Agatho (c. 578–590)
Victor (attested 591–599)
Ioannes (attested 603)
Felix (649)
Theodorus (787)
Anonymous (c. 800)
Anonymous (819)
Arab Conquest of Sicily
Humbertus (c. 1052–1054)
Nicodemus (1065)
Alcherius (1083–1099)
Gualterius (1112, 1113, 1117)
Pietro (ca. 1123 – after 1130)
Rogerius Frescra (c. 1141 – July 1143)
Hugh (Ugo) (1150 – c. 1161)
Stephen du Perche (1166–1170)
Walterius Ophamil (1170–1187)
Bartholomeus (1194–1201)

from 1200 to 1400

Parisius (22 May 1201 – before 10 May 1213)
Berardus de Castacca (11 September 1213 – 8 September 1252)
Guilelmus
Leonardus (1261 – c. 1270)
Giovanni Misnelli (2 June 1273 – ? )
Petrus de Santafede (c. 1278 – 1284?)
Licius (10 January 1304 – 12 December 1304)
Bartolommeo (de Antiochia) (31 January 1306 – 1312)
Franciscus (de Antiochia) (9 May 1312 – 1320)
Giovanni Orsini (10 October 1320 – c. 1333)
Cardinal Matteo Orsini, O.P.  (1334 – 1336 Resigned)
Theobaldus (24 April 1336 – c. 1350)
Roger de Palheriis (Pulcheriis), O.Min. (17 November 1351 – 1360–1361)
Arnaldus Caprarii, O.Min. (11 March 1361 – 1362)
Octavianus de Labro (8 November 1362 – 1363)
Melchiore Bevilacqua (20 December 1363 – 1364)
Martinus de Aretio (15 January 1365 – 1366)
Matthaeus de Cumis (13 November 1366 – 1376–1377)
Nicolaus de Agrigento, O.Min. (18 February 1377 – after 1384)
Ludovico Bonito (Ludovicus Bonitus) (before 1 June 1387 – 1395)
Gilfortus Riccobono (23 October 1395 – 1398)
[Franciscus Vitalis]

from 1400 to 1600

Joannes de Procida (1400–1408)
Cardinal Rinaldo Brancaccio  (4 Aug 1410 – 1414 Resigned) Administrator
Ubertinus de Marinis (20 June 1414 – 1434) 
Niccolò Tedeschi, O.S.B.  (9 Mar 1435 – 24 Feb 1445 Died)
Marino Orsini (4 June 1445 – 30 July 1445)
Simone Beccatelli (Bonovius) (1446–1465)
Nicolaus Pujades (23 August 1465 – 1467)
Giovanni Burgio  (16 Nov 1467 – 1469 Died)
Paolo Visconti, O.Carm.  (6 Sep 1469 – 1473 Died)
Philip of Viana (Filippo di Navarra) (31 Jan 1477 – 1485 Resigned)
 Cardinal Pierre de Foix (le jeune)  (14 May 1485 – 6 Jul 1489 Appointed, Administrator of Malta)
Giovanni Paternò, O.S.B.  (6 Jul 1489 – 1511 Died)
 Cardinal Francisco de Remolins  (23 Jan 1512 – 5 Feb 1518)
 Cardinal Tommaso De Vio (Thomas Cajetan), O.P. (8 February 1518 – 19 December 1519) Administrator
Giovanni Carondelet (Jean Carondelet) (19 Dec 1519 – 26 Mar 1544)
Cardinal Pietro Tagliavia d’Aragonia  (10 Oct 1544 – 5 Aug 1558 Died)
Francisco Orozco de Arce  (15 Mar 1559 – 11 Oct 1561 Died)
Ottaviano Preconio, O.F.M. Conv.  (18 Mar 1562 – 18 Aug 1568 Died)
Juan Segría (Cengria)  (16 Sep 1569 – 1570 Died)
Giacomo Lomellino del Canto  (10 Jan 1571 – 9 Aug 1575 Died)
Cesare Marullo (11 Sep 1577 – 12 Nov 1588 Died)

from 1600 to 1800

Diego Haëdo  (14 Aug 1589 – 5 Jul 1608 Died)
Cardinal Giovanni Doria  (5 Jul 1608  – 19 Nov 1642)
Fernando Andrade Castro  (28 Nov 1644  – 6 Jul 1648 Appointed, Archbishop (Personal Title) of Jaén)
Martín de León Cárdenas, O.S.A.  (27 Aug 1650 – 15 Nov 1655 Died)
Pietro Jerónimo Martínez y Rubio  (15 Jan 1657  – 22 Nov 1667 Died)
Juan Lozano, O.S.A.  (4 Feb 1669 – 26 Apr 1677
Jaime de Palafox y Cardona  (8 Nov 1677 – 13 Nov 1684)
Ferdinando Bazan y Manriquez  (1 Apr 1686 – 11 Aug 1702 Died)
José Gasch (Casch), O.M.  (26 Nov 1703 – 11 Jun 1729 Died)
Giovanni Maurizio Gustavo  (1730 – 1731 Died)
Paolo Basile (Mathaeus de Pareta), O.F.M. Obs.  (3 Sep 1731  – Jan 1736 Died)
Domenico Rossi (Rosso e Colonna), O.S.B.  (8 Jul 1737 – 6 Jul 1747 Died)
José Alfonso Meléndez, O.F.M. Disc.  (19 Feb 1748 – 31 Oct 1753 Died)
Marcello Papiniano-Cusani  (11 Feb 1754 – 16 Jun 1762 Resigned)
Serafino Filangeri, O.S.B.  (23 Aug 1762 – 29 Jan 1776 Appointed, Archbishop of Naples)
Francesco Ferdinando Sanseverino, C.P.O.  (15 Apr 1776 – 31 Mar 1793 Died)
Filippo López y Rojo, C.R.  (17 Jun 1793 – 4 Sep 1801 Resigned)

since 1800

Cardinal Domenico Pignatelli di Belmonte, C.R.  (29 Mar 1802 – 5 Feb 1803 Died)
Raffaele Mormile, C.R.  (28 Mar 1803 – 31 Dec 1813 Died)
Cardinal Pietro Gravina  (23 Sep 1816 – 6 Dec 1830 Died)
Cardinal Gaetano Maria Giuseppe Benedetto Placido Vincenzo Trigona e Parisi  (15 Apr 1833  – 5 Jul 1837 Died)
Cardinal Ferdinando Maria Pignatelli, C.R.  (21 Feb 1839 – 10 May 1853 Died)
Giovanni Battista Naselli, C.O.  (27 Jun 1853 – 3 May 1870 Died)
Cardinal Michelangelo Celesia, O.S.B.  (27 Oct 1871 – 14 April 1904)
Cardinal Alessandro Lualdi  (14 Nov 1904 – 12 Nov 1927 Died)
Cardinal Luigi Lavitrano (29 Sep 1928 – Dec 1944 Resigned)
Cardinal Ernesto Ruffini (11 Oct 1945 – 11 Jun 1967 Died)
Cardinal Francesco Carpino (26 Jun 1967 – 17 Oct 1970 Resigned)
Cardinal Salvatore Pappalardo (17 Oct 1970 – 4 Apr 1996)
Cardinal Salvatore De Giorgi (4 Apr 1996 – 19 Dec 2006 Retired)
Cardinal Paolo Romeo (19 Dec 2006 – 27 Oct 2015 Retired)
Corrado Lorefice (27 Oct 2015 – )

References

Books

Reference works
 (in Latin)
 (in Latin)

 pp. 946–947. (Use with caution; obsolete)
 (in Latin)
 (in Latin)
 (in Latin)

Studies

Kamp, Norbert (1975). Kirche und Monarchie im staufischen Königreich Sizilien: I. Prosopographische Grundlegung, Bistumer und Bischofe des Konigreichs 1194–1266: 3. Sizilien München: Wilhelm Fink 1975, pp. 1109–1145.
Loud, G. A. (2007). The Latin Church in Norman Italy. Cambridge: Cambridge University Press.

External links
 Official site

Palermo,Roman Catholic Archdiocese

Palermo
Christianity in Palermo
History of Palermo